Kwon Chan-Soo  (born May 30, 1974) is a South Korean former football player. His previous club is K-League side Seongnam Ilhwa Chunma and Incheon United.

Club career statistics

External links
 

1974 births
Living people
Association football goalkeepers
South Korean footballers
Seongnam FC players
Incheon United FC players
K League 1 players
Dankook University alumni